Miss Spain 2018 may refer to these events:
Miss Universe Spain 2018, Miss Spain 2018 for Miss Universe 2018
Miss World Spain 2018, Miss Spain 2018 for Miss World 2018